Mehmanshahr-e Ahangaran (also Romanized as Mehmānshahr-e Āhangarān; also known as Ordūgāh-e Āfāghaneh) is a village in Zirkuh Rural District, Central District, Zirkuh County, South Khorasan Province, Iran. At the 2006 census, its population was 266, in 69 families.

References 

Populated places in Zirkuh County